James Caulfeild, 3rd Viscount Charlemont (29 July 1682 – 21 April 1734) was an Anglo-Irish politician and peer. 

Caulfeild was the son of William Caulfeild, 2nd Viscount Charlemont and Anne Margetson. He was educated at Trinity College Dublin, graduating with a bachelor of arts in 1702 and with a master of arts in 1704.

He was the Member of Parliament for Charlemont in the Irish House of Commons from 1703 to 1705, before representing the seat again from 1713 to 1726. On 21 July 1726 he inherited his father's viscountcy and assumed his seat in the Irish House of Lords. 

Caulfeild married Elizabeth Bernard, daughter of Francis Bernard and Alice Ludlow. Together they had three children; their eldest son, James Caulfeild, was made Earl of Charlemont in 1763.

References

1682 births
1734 deaths
17th-century Anglo-Irish people
18th-century Anglo-Irish people
Alumni of Trinity College Dublin
James
Irish MPs 1703–1713
Irish MPs 1713–1714
Irish MPs 1715–1727
Members of the Parliament of Ireland (pre-1801) for County Armagh constituencies
Viscounts Charlemont
Viscounts in the Peerage of Ireland